The main campus of Southern Illinois University Carbondale contains numerous statues, landmarks, memorials, and other monuments dedicated to or created by former students, staff, and faculty of the university. Many of these artifacts commemorate the deaths and accomplishments of these individuals. Other monuments include commissioned works of art or group memorials, or else landmarks important to the history of the university. Included in this list are many examples of modern sculpture.

Early memorials are often set into the ground and accompanied by a specially planted tree. More modern memorials usually take the form of a bench with an attached plaque. While nearly all of the buildings on the SIU campus are named for individuals associated with the university, very few rooms within these buildings have been dedicated to specific individuals. In many cases, memorials are centered around buildings related to the work of those memorialized. For instance, Philosophy Department faculty memorials are found near the south end of Faner Hall, former home of the SIU Philosophy Department, while memorials to students and faculty of the School of Education are found around Pulliam Hall, historically the site of SIU's Teachers College. The area of campus nicknamed "Old Campus" contains the largest amount of memorials.

The earliest artifact viewable publicly on campus which can be identified dates to 1870, and is the cornerstone of the now-demolished Wheeler Library. The earliest monument dedicated to an individual which can be identified dates to 1950, and was dedicated to William Marberry.

SIU-C
Monuments and memorials in Illinois
Southern Illinois University Carbondale